Khalid Khalifa Salim Al-Hajri (born 10 March 1994), is an Omani footballer who currently plays as a forward for Oman Football League side Bahla Club.  

He also played in UAE Pro League side Al Dhafra FC on loan from Oman Club.

Club career
Al-Hajri joined UAE side Al Dhafra from Oman Club on a six-month loan in early 2017. Having gone his first six games without scoring, he scored two goals in a 3–0 win over Emirates Club in March 2017.

International career
Al-Hajri made his international debut in a 14–0 victory over Bhutan, coming on as a 63rd minute substitute to score four goals. He also represented the under 17 side, scoring in a 2–1 loss to Saudi Arabia in 2010. He also played for the under 19 side in 2011, and was called up to the Olympic side in 2014.

Career statistics

International

International goals
Scores and results list Oman's goal tally first.

References

External links
 
 

1994 births
Living people
Omani footballers
Omani expatriate footballers
Association football forwards
Oman Club players
Al Dhafra FC players
Oman Professional League players
UAE Pro League players
Omani expatriate sportspeople in the United Arab Emirates
Expatriate footballers in the United Arab Emirates
2019 AFC Asian Cup players
Oman international footballers